Reviewer (April 30, 1966 – June 6, 1977) was an American Thoroughbred racehorse best known as the sire of U.S. Racing Hall of Fame filly Ruffian.

Background
Foaled in Kentucky, the dark bay colt was owned and bred by Ogden Phipps. He was a son of Bold Ruler, an important Champion sire, and his damsire was Hasty Road, who won the 1954 Preakness Stakes.

Racing career
Trained by Hall of Fame inductee Edward A. Neloy, in 1970 the then four-year-old Reviewer set a new Belmont Park track record of 1:46 4/5 for 1⅛ miles in winning the Nassau County Handicap. He finished his racing career with a record of 13: 9-3-1, and he won $247,223.

Stud record
Ruffian was foaled in Reviewer's first crop. The filly was euthanized in 1975 following surgery to repair a broken leg sustained in a race. Reviewer himself broke three legs during his career before being retired to stud; he suffered a fourth broken leg in a paddock accident at Claiborne Farm and was subsequently euthanized. His line was known as "soft- boned runners".  Shenanigans, Ruffian's mother, was euthanized on May 21, 1977, when she broke two legs after waking from an intestinal surgery.  Among his other progeny, Reviewer sired the 1976 American Champion Three-Year-Old Filly Revidere and the good runner Drama Critic (b. 1974).

References

External links
 Reviewer's pedigree and partial racing stats

Pedigree

1966 racehorse births
1977 racehorse deaths
Racehorses bred in Kentucky
Racehorses trained in the United States
Horse racing track record setters
Thoroughbred family 5-c
Chefs-de-Race